Stepan Goryachevskikh (born 26 June 1985) is a Russian-Belarusian professional ice hockey goaltender currently playing HC Lada Togliatti of the Kontinental Hockey League.

External links

1985 births
Living people
Belarusian ice hockey players
HC Donbass players
HC Neftekhimik Nizhnekamsk players
Russian ice hockey goaltenders
HC Shakhtyor Soligorsk players
Shinnik Bobruisk players
Yunost Minsk players
Universiade medalists in ice hockey
Universiade silver medalists for Belarus
Competitors at the 2011 Winter Universiade